Grand Central River is a waterway on the Seward Peninsula in the U.S. state of Alaska. It enters Salmon Lake from the west. Although the Grand Central and Kruzgamepa (or Pilgrim) rivers form one stream, their names differ, and their physical features vary. The Grand Central flows into Salmon Lake, while the Kruzgamepa flows out.

Geography
On either side, there is a little bottom land, from which the mountains rise abruptly. The principal tributaries of Grand Central River below the forks are Gold Run and Rainbow Creek from the east, and Thompson, Thumit, Nugget, Jett, and Morning Call creeks from the west. These tributary streams, with the exception of Nugget Creek, drain short, steep-sided gulches. They have considerable fall and are fed from melting snow.

See also
List of rivers of Alaska

References

Rivers of the Seward Peninsula
Rivers of Alaska
Rivers of Nome Census Area, Alaska
Rivers of Unorganized Borough, Alaska